Bärbel Jungmeier (born 8 July 1975) is a road cyclist and mountain bike rider from Austria. She represented her nation at the 2004 Summer Olympics in the Women's cross-country. She also competed at the 2006 UCI Road World Championships.

References

External links
 profile at Procyclingstats.com

1975 births
Austrian female cyclists
Living people
Sportspeople from Villach
Cyclists at the 2004 Summer Olympics
Olympic cyclists of Austria
21st-century Austrian women